Vicki Miles-LaGrange (born September 30, 1953) is an inactive Senior United States district judge of the United States District Court for the Western District of Oklahoma. She was the first African-American woman to be sworn in as United States Attorney for the Western District of Oklahoma. She was also the first African-American woman elected to the Oklahoma Senate.

Early life and education 

Born September 30, 1953, in Oklahoma City, Oklahoma, Miles-LaGrange, received a certificate from the University of Ghana in Accra, Ghana, West Africa in 1973, and graduated cum laude from Vassar College with a Bachelor of Arts degree in 1974. In 1977, she received her Juris Doctor from Howard University School of Law in Washington, D.C., where she was an editor of The Howard Law Journal.
As an honors graduate of Howard University School of Law, Washington, D.C., she served as an Editor of The Howard Law Journal while working part-time as a Congressional Intern for U.S. House Speaker Carl Albert.

Career in government 

Before 1977 she served as a legislative intern for Speaker of the House Carl Albert, a law clerk for district judge Luther L. Bohanon, a law clerk for the United States Commission on Civil Rights, and a law clerk for the law firm of Arnold & Porter. Miles-LaGrange served as a law clerk to Woodrow Seals of the United States District Court for the Southern District of Texas from 1977 to 1979.

She was a graduate fellow in the Criminal Division of the United States Department of Justice in Washington, D.C. from 1979 to 1980, and a special assistant to the African Development Group, Washington, D.C. from 1980 to 1981. She was, at the same time, a lecturer in the Women's Studies Program at the University of Maryland, College Park in 1981. From 1981 to 1982, she was a special assistant to the African Development Group in Washington, DC. She was a trial attorney of Office of Enforcement Operations, United States Department of Justice from 1982 to 1983.

She returned to Oklahoma to serve as an assistant district attorney for Oklahoma County from 1983 to 1986, where she prosecuted sex crimes. She then entered the private practice of law in Oklahoma City from 1986 to 1993, and was during that period an Oklahoma State Senator from 1987 to 1993, making her the first African-American woman elected to the Oklahoma State Senate along with Maxine Horner. She was the United States Attorney for the Western District of Oklahoma from 1993 to 1994.

Federal judicial service 

Miles-LaGrange was nominated by President Bill Clinton on September 22, 1994, to a seat on the United States District Court for the Western District of Oklahoma vacated by Lee Roy West. She was confirmed by the United States Senate on October 7, 1994, and received her commission on November 28, 1994. She served as Chief Judge from 2008 to 2015. She took inactive senior status on November 5, 2018, meaning that while she remains a Federal Judge, though she will no longer hear cases or participate in the business of the court.

Notable case
Miles-LaGrange's preliminary ruling enjoining amendment of the Oklahoma Constitution to prohibit the state's courts from either "considering or using" international law or Islamic Sharia law attracted considerable attention.

See also 
 List of African-American federal judges
 List of African-American jurists
 List of first women lawyers and judges in Oklahoma

References

External links

Confirmation hearings on federal appointments : hearings before the Committee on the Judiciary, United States Senate, One Hundred Third Congress, first session on confirmations of appointees to the federal judiciary. pt. 6 (1996) 
Western District of Oklahoma official website
Find Law Profile
Alpha Kappa Alpha Midwestern Region
Uncrowned Queens:Vicki Miles-LaGrange
Access to Justice, Reform in Rwanda
Women of the Oklahoma Legislature Oral History Project--OSU Library
Oklahoma Historical Society-Encyclopedia of Oklahoma History & Culture-Vicki Miles-LaGrange
Oklahoma Hall of Fame Biography of Vicki Miles-LaGrange

1953 births
Living people
20th-century American judges
20th-century American women judges
21st-century American judges
21st-century American women judges
African-American judges
African-American state legislators in Oklahoma
African-American women in politics
Arnold & Porter people
Howard University School of Law alumni
Judges of the United States District Court for the Western District of Oklahoma
Democratic Party Oklahoma state senators
Lawyers from Oklahoma City
United States Attorneys for the Western District of Oklahoma
United States district court judges appointed by Bill Clinton
University of Ghana alumni
Vassar College alumni
Women state legislators in Oklahoma